Sarasara (born Sarah Filleur, 28 January 1986), is a French singer, songwriter, electronic musician and record producer. Born in Fourmies, Nord, she began her music career in 2014. Following the success of her self-released David Bowie cover "Heroes", Sarasara moved to the UK to work on her first extended play in collaboration with Matthew Herbert. The EP drew the attention of Björk's label One Little Indian, who signed Sarah in January 2016. Sarasara subsequently released her debut studio album, Amor Fati in November 2016 to critical acclaim, being featured in The Guardians Future 50 rising music stars to look out for, Clash magazine, Rolling Stone and Tsugi.
Her work has been likened to Björk, Kelela, Aaliyah and Aphex Twin, drawing on various genres including electronic music, trip hop, R&B, industrial and avant-garde.

Life and career

Early life and career beginnings
Sarah was born in Fourmies, Nord. Her mother had emigrated to Paris from Morocco aged 16 following the death of her parents. Initially finding work as a cleaner, she later became the owner of a fish shop. Sarah's father, was a marketing manager for the French Wine Cabinet maker, EuroCave. The couple met in Paris in 1980 whilst Sarah's father was serving in the army. They fell in love, married, moved to the North of France and had Sarah, their only child. Tragically, Sarah's parents died in a car crash in Eppe-Sauvage when she was just 14 years-old. Sarah went to live with her Grandmother, herself a mother of 15 children. Sarah's grandfather died of cancer in 2003. Just one year later, during a holiday in Madrid, her Grandmother also passed – suffering severe shock following the 2004 Madrid train bombings.
Sarah returned to her parents’ house to live as an "emancipated minor". The successive tragedies she had experienced led her to rethink her career. Having formerly planned for a career in astrophysics, Sarah decided instead to pursue a career in business in the hope of becoming financially self-sufficient. She enrolled at the University of Valenciennes to study International Business Transactions and received a master's degree in Business Management from Institut supérieur européen de gestion group. Following her graduation, Sarah started work as a Business Unit Manager at an IT firm in Lille, specialising in mobile applications.

Artistically, Sarah's career in music was not predetermined. Although she studied music and piano as a child – going on to study operatic singing as a teenager, following encouragement from her literature teacher – it was not until 2014 that she truly began to pursue her passion for music.
Meanwhile, Sarah's musical tastes were profoundly influenced by the electronic music scene. Entering a night club for the first time in Belgium at the age of 15, she has described the experience as a "revelation". She quickly found herself frequenting clubs every single weekend, drawing inspiration from the sense of community and joy that came from sharing music. She fell in love with La Bush, one of Belgium's most famous clubs, and would frequently make the 4-hour round trip from the north of France to visit. Her passion for the electronic music scene encouraged her to build her very first studio in her parents' former bedroom, and to purchase her first Technics turntables and records.

Sarah started DJing in local clubs, and very quickly found herself producing techno music for her friends using programmed beats and vocal samples. In 2015, she self-released a cover of David Bowie's "Heroes". Receiving unprecedented success, the popularity of the release gave her the encouragement to begin to write and program her own songs. Later that year she reached out to British electronic musician, Matthew Herbert, with a set of self-produced demos. Taken by her unique talent, Herbert agreed to collaborate with Sarah on the production of her first extended play. Having long been influenced and inspired by Björk, Sarah sent the EP to her record label, One Little Indian. In January 2016, One Little Indian's Managing Director, Derek Birkett, signed Sarasara to the label.

2016–2018: Amor Fati 

Sarasara's debut studio album, Amor Fati, was released on 11 November 2016. The title was inspired by Nietzsche's philosophy, and in particular, his philosophical novel: Thus Spoke Zarathustra. Amor Fati can be translated as “love of fate” or “love of one’s fate”. To Sarah,  Amor Fati represents going beyond simply accepting one's fate. It is about wanting to make one's own fate - reaching for it, attracting it. In an interview for The 405, the singer explained that, "in order to change one’s fate, one has to work instinctively – finding the willpower in their consciousness by listening to their body". The debut album featured four singles: Euphoria, Supernova, Sun  and Love, and was met with significant critical acclaim. The Guardian profiled Sarasara for their "New Band of the Week" feature, describing her as “... All cute breathy vocal-sighs and crashing dissonance, her music is what might have happened had Petite Meller signed to 90s Warp, or the next (il)logical step after the likes of FKA twigs, Kelela and SZA: a sort of industrial- Strength R&B; Aaliyah meets Aphex Twin”. She was subsequently featured as one of The Guardian's Future 50 Rising Stars, and the album received a rating of 8/10 from Clash (magazine). The release of the Amor Fati was accompanied by an international tour, featuring shows in Paris, London, Copenhagen, Amsterdam, Los Angeles, New York, and music industry festivals such as The Great Escape Festival, Printemps de Bourges, MaMa Paris and South by South West (including the SXSW Hackathon) in Austin.

Imagery

Sarah worked closely in the digital imagery for Amor Fati. Her cinematic ambitions have been shaped by artists such as David Lynch, Stanley Kubrick, Maya Daren, Alfred Hitchcock, Quentin Tarantino, and Robert Rodriguez. The album's artwork was produced in collaboration with British photographer and artist Alva Bernadine, drawing inspiration from his series ‘Succubus’. Sarah's passion and love of antique sculptures drew her to Alva – renowned for his background in fashion and the playfulness with which his work portrays the female body.
The video for Euphoria emerged in collaboration with Israeli film animator Leopold Amitay. The video features a 2D animation based on Sarah's face and illustrative of her character. It was inspired by photographer Richard Avedon's famous portrait of Audrey Hepburn and the popular Greek mythological creature, Medusa. The video for Sun was shot in collaboration with Belgium filmmaker Gust Van den Berghe (Little Baby Jesus of Flandr, Blue Bird, Lucifer) on a prototype camera called a Tondoscope. The camera was invented by Gust for his film "Lucifer", and incorporates the lens within a glass tube so as to capture images in 360 degree, producing a circular canvas. The video for Love was directed, shot and edited by Sarasara in collaboration with British filmmaker Nikolai Galitzine Yurievitch (Iris, Dear Child, From the Mountain).

Further releases

Exactly one year after her release of Amor Fati, Sarasara released Amor Fati, the a cappella album, a recomposition of the album in collaboration with French vocal performers. Recorded in the Sculpture Chamber of Palais des Beaux-Arts de Lille, the album includes multiple influences such as Gospel, Soul, Rap, Opera and Beatbox. Amor Fati was further released as a Remixes EP, featuring remixes from Matthew Herbert, Susso, Crewdson and Earth is Flat. A deluxe version was released in March 2018.

2019–2020: Orgone 
Following the success of her debut studio release, Sarasara released her much anticipated second album, Orgone with One Little Indian Records on July 5, 2019. Produced in collaboration with Sneaker Pimps label-mate Liam Howe, Orgone is Sarah's first album in French, her mother tongue. The album features four singles: Blood Brothers, Into Me See, Ego Trip and Tinkertoy feat. Peter Doherty. It has been met with widespread critical acclaim across the globe, being featured in Marie Claire Magazine, NME, Rolling Stone and New York Times Magazine.

Orgone reflects Sarasara's growth as an artist. Taking three years to complete, it is an intimately personal record that tells the story of her whirlwind entrance into the music industry. It is the story of her being tossed around – between two cycles, two careers, two homes and two countries. It is the story of the process of rebuilding after the end of karmic relationships and of falling in love again. It is the story of finding her way on a spiritual path, connecting with God, and learning the virtues of vulnerability, self-love, acceptance, surrendering to what is and being true to oneself. It is her taking responsibility for what she is putting into the universe, reclaiming her creative power, and, ultimately, becoming a better version of herself. In May 2020, Sarasara was featured in the Visual Collaborative electronic catalog, under the Amplified series, she was interviewed alongside other creatives from around the world.

The album toured globally, with dates across the US, Japan, South Korea, Germany, France, Italy, Spain, Belgium and the UK.

Orgone was further released as a Remixes EP, featuring remixes from Liam Howe, Howie B, Hannah Peel, Mololoc, Michael Forzza and Dimitri Andreas.

Artistry

Music influences and style

Sarah's musical influences and aspirations centre around powerful and iconic women in the music industry. Artists such as Björk, Madonna, Lady Gaga and Vanessa Paradis have been particularly inspiring. Sarah's music draws on a variety of styles, including electronic music, R&B, trip hop, industrial and avant-garde. Her work has been compared to the work of Björk, as well as Aphex Twin, Kelela and Aaliyah. Sarasara's music makes use of her childhood classical signing training, and her literature teacher's advice that she had potential to become a Soprano singer. But it is also influenced by her incredibly eclectic musical tastes, growing up listening to everything from Techno to Classical music. Some of her favourite artists include for Electronic: Laurent Garnier, Richie Hawtin, Ricardo Villalobos - Detroit techno: Derrick May, Kevin Saunderson, Jeff Mills , Juan Atkins - Delta Blues Gospel: Lead Belly, Nina Simone, Jeff Buckley, Janis Joplin - French popular: Jacques Brel, Serge Gainsbourg, Vanessa Paradis, Georges Brassens - French and American Hip Hop and Rap - IAM,  MC Solaar, Sayan Supa Crew, Wu Tang Clan, Cypress Hill.

The result is a style that has been defined as “... robotic: pitting African instruments against squelching, mutant machine beats”. The Metropolist has likewise described her as “... an artist to watch closely – a young woman who uses technology to document and portray the agonies and dichotomies of modern-day existence ”.

Philosophy and spirituality
Sarah herself admits that her philosophy and spirituality are an intricately important part of her artistry, and is what lead her to music in the first place. Sarah's taste for philosophy and questioning of life came as a result of her premature confrontation with death. She studied philosophy at Evening School whilst working as a Business Unit Manager for an IT firm in Lille. She went on to complete a master's degree in the History of Hedonism from pre-Socratic to the present day, and found herself particularly drawn to the philosophical movements of Atomism, Stoicism, Epicureanism and Vitalism, Utilitarianism, Naturalism. Her philosophical influences include:
Lucretius, Marcus Aurelius, Epicurus, Michel de Montaigne, Soren Kierkegaard, Jeremy Bentham, Voltaire, Nietzsche, Thoreau, Hannah Arendt, Jung, Wilhelm Reich.
More recently, Sarah's engagement with such philosophers has drawn her to ancient eastern philosophy, most importantly Hinduism, Mysticism and Kriya Yoga. Sarah has referred to Yogananda Paramahansa's Autobiography of a Yogi as "a life changing book", and has been profoundly influenced by the spiritual masters Swami Kriyananda, Nayaswami Asha, Sadhguru. Sarah's practice of Kriya Yoga, and her journey on a new spiritual path continue to influence and enhance her music.

Discography

Albums
Amor Fati (2016)
Amor Fati: The A Cappella Album (2017)
Orgone (2019)
Orgonum: The Remixes EP (2019)
Sarasara x Serge Gainsbourg EP (2022)

Remixes
 Hannah Peel"Particule D2" (Sarasara remix) from Particle in Space EP (2018)
 Crass"Asylum" (Sarasara remix) from Normal never was & Feeding of the 5000 Remixes (2020)

Featurings
 Ghostpoet"This trainwreck of a life" from I Grow Tired But Dare Not Fall Asleep (2020)
 Ghostpoet"Social lacerations" from I Grow Tired But Dare Not Fall Asleep (2020)

References

External links 
 
 
 One Little Indian Records

Living people
French women singer-songwriters
People from Fourmies, Nord
French record producers
1986 births
French people of Moroccan descent